The 1910 William & Mary Orange and Black football team represented the College of William & Mary as a member of the Eastern Virginia Intercollegiate Athletic Association (EVIAA) during the 1910 college football season. Led by third-year head coach J. Merrill Blanchard, who returned to William & Mary after helming the team in 1904 and 1905, the Orange and Black finished the season with an overall record of 1–7–1 and mark of 1–2 in EVIAA play.

Schedule

References

William and Mary
William & Mary Tribe football seasons
William and Mary Orange and Black football